The men's 200 metre freestyle event at the 1980 Summer Olympics was held on 21 July at the Swimming Pool at the Olimpiysky Sports Complex. There were 42 competitors from 24 nations, with each nation having up to three swimmers. The event was won by Sergey Koplyakov of the Soviet Union, with his countryman Andrey Krylov finishing second. The medals were the first for the Soviet Union in the men's 200 metre freestyle. Graeme Brewer of Australia won that nation's first medal in the event since 1968 with his bronze.

Background

This was the sixth appearance of the 200 metre freestyle event. It was first contested in 1900. It would be contested a second time, though at 220 yards, in 1904. After that, the event did not return until 1968; since then, it has been on the programme at every Summer Games.

One of the 8 finalists from the 1976 Games returned: fourth-place finisher Andrey Krylov of the Soviet Union. The American-led boycott severely impacted swimming in 1980; the United States had swept this event in 1976. The 1978 World Aquatics Championships winner and runner-up were Americans; neither Bill Forrester nor Rowdy Gaines (who also held the world record) could compete. World bronze medalist Sergey Koplyakov of the Soviet Union was the favourite in their absence.

Algeria, Angola, Czechoslovakia, Lebanon, Mozambique, Vietnam, and Zimbabwe each made their debut in the event. Australia made its sixth appearance, the only nation to have competed in all prior editions of the event other than the absent United States.

Competition format

The competition used a two-round (heats, final) format. The advancement rule followed the format introduced in 1952. A swimmer's place in the heat was not used to determine advancement; instead, the fastest times from across all heats in a round were used. There were 8 heats of up to 8 swimmers each. The top 8 swimmers advanced to the final. Swim-offs were used as necessary to break ties.

This swimming event used freestyle swimming, which means that the method of the stroke is not regulated (unlike backstroke, breaststroke, and butterfly events). Nearly all swimmers use the front crawl or a variant of that stroke. Because an Olympic-size swimming pool is 50 metres long, this race consisted of four lengths of the pool.

Records

Prior to this competition, the existing world and Olympic records were as follows.

The following records were established during the competition:

Schedule

All times are Moscow Time (UTC+3)

Results

Heats

Final

References

F
200 metre freestyle at the Olympics
Men's events at the 1980 Summer Olympics